Jeerjimbe is a 2017 Indian Kannada-language film directed by Karthik Saragur and produced by Beehive Productions in collaboration with Pushkara Mallikarjunaiah. The music was composed by Charan Raj.

The film featured in as many as 23 international film festivals before its theatrical release in November 2018.Film Companion included Jeerjimbe in one of Kannada cinema's five hidden gems from 2018.

Cast
 Siri Vanalli
 Lavanya
 Suman Nagarkar

Plot
Jeerjimbe follows the trail of a  schoolgirl Rudri -  carefree as a butterfly,  whose single-minded wish in life is to ride a bicycle of her own. Till she discovers life, and the complexities and struggles that beleaguer a teenager in rural India, that is. Astride her government-issued bicycle, Rudri persists past the ups and downs facing her, and asserts her selfhood, identity and agency in face of child marriage and other societal constraints.

Production
In an interview with Times of India, the director said, "Jeerjimbe is a story of adventures of a 13-year-old girl from a remote village in Karnataka. The story is based on the emotional struggles of a girl when a bicycle enters her life as part of the free cycles programmes provided by the government to all high-school children in rural areas". The film was made through a crowd funding campaign and was later backed by producer Pushkara Mallikarjunaiah.

Reception
The theatre release of Jeerjimbe elicited rave reviews. The Indian Express hailed Jeerjimbe as a film that "makes us believe in our dreams. And it does so effortlessly, given the complexities of human emotions during such a journey". The popular film portal "Film Companion" called Jeerjimbe a "deeply empowering social drama". Times of India likened the film "to the cinema one experiences from Iran or Italy, where the narrative is subtle and realistic". The Bangalore Mirror emphasized that Jeerjimbe is a film "that children can enjoy, grownups can empathise with and a discernible mind would appreciate".

Accolades
2016 Karnataka State Film Awards
This film won four Karnataka State Film Awards, the most for any film in 2016.
 Best Children's Film
 Best Lyricist – Karthik Saragur
 Best Music – Charan Raj
 Best Child Actor – Siri Vanalli

References

2010s Kannada-language films
2017 films